Burn Standard Company Limited (BSCL) is a Public Sector Undertaking (PSU) of the Government of India. Headquartered in Howrah , India, BSCL is engaged mainly in railway wagon manufacturing under the Ministry of Railways. On 4 April 2018, Cabinet approves closure of loss making Burn Standard Company Limited. The company was formed with the merger of two companies – Burn & Company (founded 1781) and Indian Standard Wagon (founded 1918), and was nationalised in 1975. Subsequently, the company with its two engineering units at Howrah and Burnpur came under the administrative control of Ministry of Railways in September 2010. The refractory unit at Salem, Tamil Nadu, was transferred to Steel Authority of India Limited.

According to UK based newspaper Independent, in March 2008, John Messer, the lead in-house lawyer for US engineering group McDermott International, was still trying to get paid for a  contract drawn up in the late 1980s to build a giant offshore platform for the Mumbai High oil field. In October 2006, Burn Standard, the Indian engineering company that sub-contracted work on the project to McDermott, lost its appeal against a court ruling instructing it to pay the US group $90m (£45m). The amount due has already been paid after finalization of the arbitration and initiative taken by the Government of India.

Products and services

 Railway wagons: tanker, hopper, flat
 Casnub bogies
 Couplers and Draft Gears
 Steel Castings, Pressings, Forgings
 Bridge Girders, Structurals, Sleepers, Points and Crossings, Wagon Components
 Wagon refurbishment
 Burn Standard India renovated SLC Type for the CLC system in Kolkata in 1980s.
 Ash/coal plant construction
 In the mid-1980s, Burn Standard had started an offshore construction unit at Jellingham, East Midnapore, West Bengal. The products were decks, helidecks, and jackets for Bombay High.

Liquidation

On the 4th of April 2018, the Government of India approved the liquidation of Burn Standard Company.

References

External links 
 http://www.burnstandard.com/ (Official Website)

Government-owned companies of India
Engineering companies of India
Companies based in Kolkata
Companies nationalised by the Government of India
Coach and wagon manufacturers of India
1976 establishments in West Bengal
Indian companies established in 1976